This is a list of Swedish television related events from 2006.

Events
10 March - Singer and finalist from the second season of Idol Måns Zelmerlöw and his partner Maria Karlsson win the first season of Let's Dance.
22 May - Jessica Lindgren wins the second season of the Scandinavian version of Big Brother for Sweden.
1 December - Markus Fagervall wins the third season of Idol.

Debuts

6 January - Let's Dance (2006–present)

Television shows

2000s
Idol (2004-2011, 2013–present)
1-24 December - LasseMajas detektivbyrå

Ending this year
The Scandinavian version of Big Brother (2005-2006, 2014–present)

Births

Deaths

See also
 2006 in Sweden
 List of Swedish television ratings for 2006

References